Khiladi No. 1 is a 2008 Indian Bhojpuri language action drama film directed by Ramana Mogili, written by Rajendra Bharadwaj and produced by B O Subba Reddy. The film stars Dinesh Lal Yadav and Pakhi Hegdein and features Rami Reddy, Mukthar Khan, and Manoj Tiger in supporting roles. The soundtrack and score were composed by Dhananjay Mishra. Mohan Chand was the film's cinematographer. The Bhojpuri version was released on 8 August 2008. The film was dubbed into Telugu as  Bhairavi and in Hindi as Ghayal Khiladi. The film holds the record for "Most Viewed Bhojpuri Film" on the YouTube channel "T-Series" with 11657414 million views.<ref>Khiladi No.1 move ", ‘’T-Series Hamara Bhojpuri Youtube Channel. Retrieved 1 October 2022.</ref> The film had the biggest opening for a Bhojpuri film and is considered the biggest Bhojpuri hit. The film is based on true events and addresses issues of rape, trafficking and crimes committed against women in India.

 Plot 
The narrative opens with a confrontation between Chandan (Dinesh Lal Yadav), a porter at the vegetable market, and local bullies. Everyone who sells veggies at the market loves him. He is in love with Ganga (Paki Hegde), the owner of a hotel in the same area as Chandan, but he does not give her any consideration. He frequents the city's brothels and sex workers. One day, when drunken rowdies are harassing the girl, Chandan tries to protect her. She is identified as the Bhairavi'' (Abhinaya Sri) criminal inspector at that scene. She is looking into the kidnapping and disappearance of people in the area. During the course of Bhairavi's investigation, important mafia allies are discovered. She learns that Chandan is a kidnapper. Since justice could not be done in a courtroom, he set up a public trial at the vegetable market. Chandan questions what kind of punishment should be meted out to individuals who are encouraging girls to engage in prostitution and human trafficking. In the midst of the intense events, a toddler steals the policeman's gun and shoots the criminals. The final phrase of the movie is, "Tomorrow's generation will not stand idly by when justice is not served to the guilty."

Cast
 Dinesh Lal Yadav as Chandan
 Pakhi Hegde as Ganga
 Abhinaya Sree as Bhairavi
 Saira Banu
 Nandu as Vijay
 R. Vidyasagar Rao
 Rami Reddy
 Madhusudhan Rao
 Mukhtar Khan
 Raja Babu
 Manoj Tiger
 Master Priyanth Reddy

Music 

The soundtrack for "Khiladi No. 1" was composed by Dhananjay Mishra, with lyrics penned by Vinay Bihari. It was produced under the "T-Series" label
The soundtrack included 10 songs, an unusually large number. On October 3rd, 2008, the audio was released.

See also
Bhojpuri cinema

References

External links 
 

2008 films
2000s Bhojpuri-language films